The 50 metre rifle prone position rifle shooting event at the 1960 Olympic Games took place on September 9 & 10.

Results
The top twenty-seven in each of the two qualifying groups advanced to the final round.

Qualifying round

Group one

Group two

A total of 60 shots are taken from the prone position With the possibility of 600 overall points.

Final

References
1960 Summer Olympics results: men's shooting, from https://www.sports-reference.com/; retrieved 2010-08-24.

Shooting at the 1960 Summer Olympics
Men's 050m prone 1960